Orchies is a commune in the department of Nord in the Hauts-de-France region of northern France.

Orchies is the biggest town of the Pévèle. It is especially known for its Musée de la chicorée, the museum of chicory.

Orchies is twinned with Kelso in the Scottish Borders area of the United Kingdom.

The French Romantic composer Clément Broutin (1851–1889) was born in Orchies.

Transport
Orchies railway station is served by TER Hauts-de-France. The station is situated on a junction between the Fives–Hirson railway and the Somain–Halluin railway.

Population

Heraldry

See also 
Communes of the Nord department

References

External links

 Official web site

Communes of Nord (French department)
Nord communes articles needing translation from French Wikipedia
French Flanders